George Lee (born 28 December 1886 in Durham, County Durham, date of death unknown) was a British track and field athlete who competed in the 1912 Summer Olympics.

In 1912 at the Stockholm Olympics he was eliminated in the first round of the 5000 metres event as well as of the 10,000 metres competition.

He was the fourth-place finisher at the 1913 International Cross Country Championships, sharing in the team title with England.

References

External links
profile

1886 births
Year of death missing
Olympic athletes of Great Britain
Athletes (track and field) at the 1912 Summer Olympics
Sportspeople from Durham, England
English male long-distance runners